Xavier Charles Mendik is an English documentary filmmaker, author, and festival director. He is an associate professor in film and director of graduate studies in the School of Media at Birmingham City University, and formerly at the University of Brighton. He also runs the Cult Film Archive and is the director of Cine-Excess International Film Festival.

Early life 
Mendik was born in Birmingham, England, UK.

Career 
Mendik teaches at Birmingham City University. He runs Cine-Excess and maintains the Cult Film Archive, a large repository of cult films.  At Brunel University, he taught classes on "Buffy studies" and other cult media properties.

Along with Ernest Mathijs, Mendik is the author of 100 Cult Films, a project of the British Film Institute.  The book attracted controversy for its selections.  With Mathijs, he also co-edited The Cult Film Reader.

Bibliography

References

Further reading

Interviews 
 
 
 

Living people
Academics of the University of Brighton
Academics of Birmingham City University
1969 births